Lummis is a surname. Notable people with the surname include:

Ben Lummis (born 1978), New Zealand pop and R&B singer
Charles Fletcher Lummis (1859–1928), American journalist, historian, and poet
Cynthia Lummis (born 1954), American politician, U.S. Senator (State of Wyoming); state treasurer 1999–2007
Dayton Lummis (1903-1988), American actor
Suzanne Lummis (born 1951), American poet; granddaughter of Charles Fletcher Lummis
Trevor Lummis (contemporary), English writer and historian
William Lummis (1886–1985), British Anglican Church clergyman and historian